Kona is an adventure video game developed by the Canadian studio Parabole and published by Ravenscourt. Set in October 1970, the game centers on Carl Faubert, a private investigator, who arrives at a snowy town in Nord-du-Québec, only to find the place deserted with something that is lurking around. A sequel, Kona II: Brume, is scheduled for release in 2023.

Gameplay
Kona includes survival and supernatural elements with buildings to explore, which contain loot (tools, light) and can serve as shelters. The threats include cold (solved by setting up fire) and wolves (which can be shot or distracted with raw meat). There is a stress level, which increases by seeing upsetting scenes, dealing with tough situations, or having accidents. A higher stress level will decrease the sprint speed and add a shakier aim, but Carl can calm himself by smoking cigarettes and drinking beers that are spread around.

The navigation of the region is done by Carl's truck in a first-person viewpoint. While driving, Carl can hold the zoomable map in his right hand in case something needs to be checked. The game has Carl's thoughts being narrated as he goes through clues to find out what has happened to the town, along with puzzles that support the story.

Development
Kona was developed by the Canadian-based company Parabole. Initial funding for the game came through a crowdfunding campaign on the Kickstarter website. The campaign was launched on August 7, 2014, with a goal of CA$40,000; it ended on September 6, 2014, with CA$44,271 raised by 1,304 people. The lead developer, Alexandre Fiset, later said that the funding from Kickstarter would have produced a five-minute game. Later funding for the game came from the Canada Media Fund, which accounted for roughly half. It was released on Steam Early Access in March 2016, and fully released a year later.

Reception

On its release, Kona was met with "mixed or average" reviews from critics on Metacritic, with an aggregate score of 73% for Microsoft Windows, 71% for PlayStation 4 and 63% for Nintendo Switch.

References

External links
 

Kickstarter-funded video games
2017 video games
Early access video games
Linux games
Windows games
Xbox One games
PlayStation 4 games
Nintendo Switch games
Adventure games
Detective video games
Video games developed in Canada
Video games set in Canada
Video games set in 1970
Stadia games
Single-player video games